"Temporary One" is a Fleetwood Mac song written by Eddy Quintela and Christine McVie. The song first appeared on their 1997 live album The Dance. It was released as a single in Germany, where it peaked at No. 99 on the Media Control Charts. Fleetwood Mac performed the song on their "The Dance" tour in 1997.

Music video
The live version of the track was used as a music video in Germany.

Track listings
All songs were recorded live at Warner Bros. Studios in Burbank, California, in June 1997.

German CD single
 "Temporary One" – 3:06
 "Go Your Own Way" – 4:46
 "Songbird" – 3:05
 "Gypsy" – 4:12

Australian maxi-single
 "Temporary One"
 "Silver Springs"
 "Songbird"
 "Gypsy"

Personnel
 Christine McVie – keyboards, lead vocals
 Lindsey Buckingham – guitar, backing vocals
 Stevie Nicks – backing vocals
 John McVie – bass guitar
 Mick Fleetwood – drums

Additional personnel
 Lenny Castro – tambourine
 Brett Tuggle – rhythm guitar
 Neale Heywood – acoustic guitar
 Sharon Celani – backing vocals
 Mindy Stein – backing vocals

Charts

References

1997 singles
1997 songs
Fleetwood Mac songs
Reprise Records singles
Songs written by Christine McVie
Songs written by Eddy Quintela